The Players Tour Championship 2014/2015 was a series of snooker tournaments which started on 17 June 2014 and ended on 28 March 2015, with events held across Europe and Asia. In this season the European events formed the European Tour and events held in Asia the Asian Tour. The nine regular minor-ranking events concluded with the Finals. Both event five and event six of the European Tour were sponsored by Kreativ Dental.

Schedule

Order of Merit

European Tour 

After 6 out of 6 events:

(Top 26 players out of 395)

Asian Tour 
After 3 out of 3 events:
(Top 8 players out of 219)

Finals

The Finals of the Players Tour Championship 2014/2015 took place between 24–28 March 2015 at the Montien Riverside Hotel in Bangkok, Thailand. It was contested by the top 24 players on the European Tour Order of Merit, and the top eight from the Asian Tour Order of Merit. If a player qualified from both Order of Merits, then the highest position counted and the next player on the other list qualified. If a player finished on both lists on the same place, then the European Tour Order of Merit took precedence and the next player from the Asian Tour Order of Merit qualified. The seeding list of the Finals was based on the combined list from the earnings of both Order of Merits.

Notes

References